The 2017 Japanese Grand Prix (formally known as the 2017 Formula 1 Japanese Grand Prix) was a Formula One motor race held on 8 October 2017 at the Suzuka International Racing Course in Suzuka in the Mie Prefecture, Japan. The race was the sixteenth round of the 2017 FIA Formula One World Championship and marked the forty-third running of the Japanese Grand Prix. This would also prove to be the last Grand Prix for Jolyon Palmer, as he was replaced by Carlos Sainz Jr. for the rest of the 2017 season.

Mercedes driver Lewis Hamilton entered the round with a thirty-four-point lead over Ferrari's Sebastian Vettel in the World Drivers' Championship. Hamilton's teammate Valtteri Bottas sat third, a further twenty-five points behind. In the World Constructors' Championship, Mercedes held a lead of one hundred and eighteen points over Ferrari, with Red Bull Racing a further one hundred and fifteen points behind in third place.

Qualifying 

Notes
 – Valtteri Bottas and Kimi Räikkönen received a 5-place grid penalty for an unscheduled gearbox change.
 – Fernando Alonso received a 35-place grid penalty and both Jolyon Palmer and Carlos Sainz Jr. received a 20-place grid penalty, all for exceeding their respective quota of power unit components.

Race

Before the race started Sebastian Vettel's mechanics were working on his car. When the race started it was clear he had some serious issues with the car losing positions immediately as Lewis Hamilton led away. Carlos Sainz had an accident on the opening lap, with the safety car being deployed. Soon after the race restarted Vettel retired with engine problems. Hamilton took the victory, followed home closely by Max Verstappen with his teammate Daniel Ricciardo finishing 3rd, Valtteri Bottas was fourth and Kimi Räikkönen fifth.

Race classification

Championship standings after the race

Drivers' Championship standings

Constructors' Championship standings

 Note: Only the top five positions are included for the sets of standings.
 Bold text and an asterisk indicates competitors who still had a theoretical chance of becoming World Champion.

References

2017 Formula One races
Grand Prix
2017
Grand Prix